Yangthang Rinpoche or Domang Yangthang Rinpoche (Tib. , Wyl. mdo mang g.yang thang rin po che) or Kunzang Jigmed Dechen Ösal Dorje (Tibetan calendar: 16th Rabjyung, Sa abrul, 10th of 11th month-17th Rabjyung, Me sprel, 14th of 8th month) (1930–2016) was a renowned Nyingma teacher from the region of Yangthang who was associated with Domang Monastery, a branch of Palyul in Eastern Tibet.

Yangthang Rinpoche was a lineage holder of the Nyingthig Yabshi, which combines all the major Dzogchen schools. However, he was most well-known for deliberately staying in Tibet after its takeover by China in order to teach in the prisons. He lived for 22 years in Chinese prisons, teaching both the Tibetan prisoners and the Chinese guards. He was released following the death of Mao Zedong.

After his release under Deng Xiaoping's reforms, Yangthang Rinpoche traveled throughout Europe, Asia, and the US, to give teachings and esoteric transmissions. During his 2013 visit, his story inspired officials in Montgomery County, Maryland, to officially name April 23 "Yangthang Tulku Day." He died in Hyderabad in 2016. His life and activities are recounted in the documentary film, Domang Yangthang by Rayonner Films.

References

External links
Prayers for H.E. Kyabje Domang Yangthang Rinpoche
Biography on Pathtobuddha.com
Ven Yangthang Trulku Bio on Tara.org
TBRC Profile 
Biography on Mahasiddha.org
Yangthang Rinpoche Series on LOTSAWA HOUSE
Bras ljongs su deng rabs bod kyi bla ma rnams kyis mdzad pa dang rnam thar bsdus pa

1929 births
2016 deaths
Dzogchen lamas
Nyingma lamas
Tibetan Buddhists from Tibet